This article lists the main power stations in Albania. There were a total of 144 active power stations that operated throughout the country for the year 2016. The table below lists only stations that have at least 10 MW of power capacity.

Hydroelectric power stations

See also 

 List of power stations in Europe
 List of largest power stations in the world

References 

Albania

Power stations
Hydroelectric power stations in Albania